Elizabeth de la Poer Beresford, Baroness Decies (April 22, 1868 – June 13, 1944), was an American author and Manhattan socialite.

Birth 
She was born on April 22, 1868, in Philadelphia, Pennsylvania, to Lucy Wharton and Joseph William Drexel. Joseph was the son of Francis Martin Drexel, the immigrant ancestor of the Drexel banking family in the United States.

Career 

Elizabeth was an author, who published two books, "King Lehr" and the Gilded Age (1935) and Turn of the World (1937). Her first novel, published after the death of her second husband, tells the story of her unhappy marriage to Lehr, which was referred to as a "tragic farce" of a 28-year marriage. It was described as follows in Time magazine, 

Her second book, and first as Lady Decies, Turn of the World, was also a semi-autobiographical history of American high society during the Gay Nineties up through the First World War.  Upon the book's publication, The Pittsburgh Press wrote,

Personal life

First marriage
On June 29, 1889, Elizabeth married John Vinton Dahlgren (1869–1899), a graduate from Georgetown University and the son of Admiral John Adolph Dahlgren (1809–1870) at St. Patrick's Cathedral in New York City. Together, they had two sons:

 Joseph Drexel Dahlgren (1890–1891), who died as an infant
 John Vinton Dahlgren Jr. (1892–1964), who married Helen Broderick in 1946, was a graduate of Harvard and Georgetown.

During this marriage, she made generous donations to Roman Catholic charities and to Georgetown University, including funds for the construction of Dahlgren Chapel, named for her first son. The latter asked for her portrait, which was painted in 1899 by the Swiss-born American artist Adolfo Müller-Ury (1862–1947).  Dahlgren died August 11, 1899, in Colorado Springs, Colorado, where he had gone in hopes of recovering from an illness.

Second marriage
In June 1901, Elizabeth married Henry Symes Lehr (1869–1929), aka Harry Lehr. The marriage was never consummated. According to her, on her wedding night, her husband told her that he loathed her and could not stand the thought of touching her ever, although he wanted her to understand she was to be cordial to him in public and he might in turn occasionally call her "darling". He had, he admitted, married her for her money because poverty terrified him.

In 1915, the Lehrs were in Paris, and Elizabeth worked for the Red Cross. They remained in Paris after World War I, where they bought in 1923 the Hôtel de Cavoye at 52, rue des Saints-Pères in the 7th arrondissement.  Harry Lehr died on January 3, 1929, of a brain malady in Baltimore.

Third marriage
On May 25, 1936, she married The Rt Hon. The 5th Baron Decies (1866–1944), a widower and Anglo-Irish peer who had previously been married to Helen Vivien Gould (1893–1931). Upon this marriage, she became The Rt Hon. Baroness Decies.

Lord Decies filed suit for divorce in 1942, which Lady Decies contested.

Lord Decies died on January 31, 1944, at his Ascot home.

Death 
Elizabeth, Lady Decies, died at the Hotel Shelton in London on June 13, 1944. She was buried in the crypt below Dahlgren Chapel at Georgetown University, which she and her first husband had built as a memorial to their son, Joseph Drexel Dahlgren, who died in infancy.

Published works 
"King Lehr" and the Gilded Age (1935) 
Turn of the World (1937)

References

Further reading 
 Time; August 5, 1935; Review of "King Lehr" and the Gilded Age
 Time; May 18, 1936 announcing the engagement of "Mrs. Henry Symes Lehr" with Lord Decies.
 Time; June 1, 1936 announcing the marriage of "Mrs. Henry Symes Lehr" and Lord Decies.
 Photo of Lord Decies and his wife after the civil wedding on the steps of the Mairie of the 7th arrondissement of Paris.
 Vanderbilt II, Arthur T. Fortune's Children. Wm. Morrow and Co., 1989.

External links 

 
 Great Day in the Morning is a play by Thomas Babe, based on Elizabeth Wharton Drexel's life (archived 7 March 2006).

1868 births
1944 deaths
American people of Austrian descent
American socialites
Elizabeth
Elizabeth Wharton
Gilded Age
Irish baronesses